Stefan Steinweg (born 24 February 1969) is a retired professional racing cyclist from Germany. He won the gold medal in the team pursuit at the 1992 Summer Olympics.

Was a member of Radsportclub Opel Schüler Berlin Steinweg mostly raced on the track, mainly in six day races at the winter.

Palmares
Olympic Champion 1992 in Barcelona Olympics
3 times World Champion
10x World Cup winner
10x German Champion

References

External links
Official Site

1969 births
Living people
German male cyclists
Cyclists from Dortmund
Cyclists at the 1992 Summer Olympics
Olympic gold medalists for Germany
Olympic cyclists of Germany
Olympic medalists in cycling
UCI Track Cycling World Champions (men)
Medalists at the 1992 Summer Olympics
German track cyclists
20th-century German people